The untitled fifth studio album by Polish rock band Coma, commonly known as Czerwony album (The Red Album), was released on October 11, 2011, through Polish label Mystic Production. It was produced by Tomasz Zalewski.

The album debuted at number 5 on the official Polish sales chart OLiS, and charted at number 1 a week later. It was certified platinum.

Track listing

Personnel

Coma
Piotr Rogucki – vocals
Dominik Witczak – guitar, backing vocals
Marcin Kobza – guitar, backing vocals
Rafał Matuszak – bass guitar, backing vocals
Adam Marszałkowski – drums, backing vocals

Additional personnel
Tomasz Zalewski – production
Artur Czarnecki – backing vocals
Albert Pabijanek – photography

Charts and certifications

Weekly charts

Certifications

References

Coma (band) albums
2011 albums
Mystic Production albums
Polish-language albums